Harriet Eivor Emilie Landström (22 March 1919 – 4 August 2004) was a Swedish actress.

Selected filmography
 Mother Gets Married (1937)
 Thunder and Lightning (1938)
 Life Begins Today (1939)
 Oh, What a Boy! (1939)
 They Staked Their Lives (1940)
 The Crazy Family (1940)
 Hanna in Society (1940)
 The Heavenly Play (1942)
 In Darkest Smaland (1943)
Widower Jarl (1945)
 Life in the Finnish Woods (1947)
 Café Lunchrasten (1954)
 Luffaren och Rasmus (1955)
 People of the Finnish Forests (1955)
 Mästerdetektiven Blomkvist lever farligt (1957)
 Musik ombord (1958)
 Siska (1962)

References

External links

1919 births
2004 deaths
Swedish film actresses
Actresses from Stockholm
20th-century Swedish actresses